Cape Kannon (=Kannonzaki) is a cape at the easternmost point of the Miura Peninsula, which divides Tokyo Bay from the Pacific Ocean.

It is on a rocky coast where the Kannonzaki Lighthouse, Japan's first modern lighthouse (after two reconstructions) stands, and faces the Uraga Channel, Japan's busiest sea lane.

Cape Kannon is located 3 kilometers east from Uraga Station of Keikyu Main Line railway. It is now part of Kannonzaki Park. The visitors to the Cape Kannon area can enjoy "Ship watching". 

It is perhaps best known as the spot where Lemuel Gulliver, the central character of Gulliver's_Travels, landed in Japan in volume 3. It is featured as 'Xamoschi', a corruption of its then-spelling Kannonsaki.

See also 
Ship watching
Kannonzaki Park

References

External links 

Kannon-zaki Lighthouse, the entrance of Tokyo Bay

Kannon
Yokosuka, Kanagawa
Tokyo Bay
Tourist attractions in Kanagawa Prefecture